The Monterey Park Spirit Bus is the transportation service of Monterey Park, California, United States, providing local routes that serve the need of those commuting within the city itself or who plan on using the bus to connect with rail service to Los Angeles or surrounding suburbs. The bus lines complement the Los Angeles County Metropolitan Transportation Authority's crosstown routes through the city.

Fixed-route service
As of April 2015, Spirit Bus operates 5 local routes. Route 1 to 4 operating in loops with terminal at Monterey Park City Hall. In addition, Spirit Bus operates Route 5 connect with regional train service at CSULA on weekdays.

Route overview

In-city service

External service

 § Peak service also serves Atlantic Square.

Spirit Bus does not operate on Sundays, Thanksgiving Day, Christmas Day or New Year's Day; Saturday service is provided on Memorial Day, Independence Day and Labor Day.

References

External links

Public transportation in Los Angeles County, California
Bus transportation in California
San Gabriel Valley